Beth E. Richie is a professor of African American Studies, Sociology, Gender and Women's Studies, and Criminology, Law, and Justice at the University of Illinois at Chicago (UIC) where she currently serves as head of the Criminology, Law, and Justice Department. From 2010 to 2016, Dr. Richie served as the director of the UIC Institute of Research on Race and Public Policy.  In 2014, she was named a senior adviser to the National Football League Players Association Commission on domestic violence and sexual assault. Of her most notable awards, Dr. Richie has been awarded the Audre Lorde Legacy Award from the Union Institute, the Advocacy Award from the US Department of Health and Human Services, and the Visionary Award from the Violence Intervention Project. Her work has been supported by multiple foundations including Robert Wood Johnson Foundation, the Ford Foundation, the National Institute for Justice, and the National Institute of Corrections.

Dr. Richie is a longtime anti-violence advocate and activist who is a founding member of INCITE! Women, Gender Non-Conforming, and Trans people of Color Against Violence

Area of interest
Beth Richie stands for the expression of women's freedom from violence and an advocate for aggression. She explains that gender violence is a main cause of women's oppression, which had many successes under the reforms that protects the rights of women who were survivors of sexual abuse and victimized sexual harassment. Her social position in her work came from incarceration and women's experiences in violence. Beth Richie widely researches and analyzes the victims behind gender violence. She finds the importance of reconciliation for women who are constantly dealing with violence. Ritchie is a  prison abolitionist.

Education and achievements
Richie earned a bachelor's degree in Social Work from Cornell University in 1979, a Master of Social Work from Washington University in St. Louis in 1980, and a Ph.D. in Sociology with a Certificate in Women's Studies from The Graduate School and University Center, City University of New York in 1992. Beth Richie has written Compelled to Crime: the Gender Entrapment of Black Battered Women, which was based on the controversy of crime, race, and gender. She was also the author of Arrested Justice: Black Women, Violence and America's Prison Nation. This book focuses on the mass incarceration during the anti-violence shift of black women in the United States that involved gender violence and criminal justice policies.  Beth Richie has been awarded by the United States Department of Health and Human Service for The Advocacy Award, also by the Union Institute for the Audre Lorde Legacy award and also awarded from the Violence Intervention Project for the Visionary Award.

Research
Beth Richie then creates groups that are like rehabilitation for women to overcome their past experiences of violence and aggression. Beth Richie was an advocate for anti-violence and studied criminology, law, and also was a justice scholar. She gathered documented stories of women that had faced unjust legalities, to remove the anti-violence struggles and also to consider the factors that later were drawn to advocacy and reform. She had identified that within revealing how it learns the focus on “neutral gender”, the powers that result in intimate partner violence, and attendant remedies have impacted the black communities in the same structure that they reject to analyze the violence that women may experience in the powers of another individual, such as economic exploitation and heterosexism.

Citations
 
 Richie, Beth E. "Who’s Who Among African Americans" Detroit, Michigan: Gale Cengage Learning, 2007.

Life
Her interests include feminist theories, sociology of race and ethnicity, criminology, and violence against women. Dr. Richie has conducted several sociological studies at Rikers Island Correctional Facility on incarcerated women, and her book Compelled to Crime: The Gender Entrapment of Battered Black Women is widely used in college courses.
Dr. Richie is also currently researching several projects investigating connections between violence against women and violence proliferated by women, especially in poor African American communities. She is on the steering committee of the Institute on Domestic Violence in the African American Community.

Publications
; originally Black Scholar, (1985)

"Reintegrating women leaving jail into urban communities: A description of a model program," (2001)

Notes

External links
Google Scholar

Living people
University of Illinois Chicago faculty
Year of birth missing (living people)
American women academics
Cornell University alumni
George Warren Brown School of Social Work alumni
Graduate Center, CUNY alumni
 Prison abolitionists